Lolsel (also, Lol-sel, Lold-la, and Loldlas) is a former Wintun settlement in Lake County, California. It was located east of Clear Lake in Long Valley; its precise location is unknown.The area where Lolsel was located is in the Pacific Time Zone (PST/PDT) and observes daylight saving time.

References

Former settlements in Lake County, California
Former Native American populated places in California
Wintun villages